"Sun & Moon" is a song by British trance group Above & Beyond featuring singer-songwriter Richard Bedford. Released in March 2011 as the lead single from their second album, Group Therapy, the song reached number 71 in the UK.

Track listing

Charts

References 

2011 songs
2011 singles
Electronic songs
Trance songs